George Clayton Johnson (July 10, 1929 – December 25, 2015) was an American science fiction writer, best known for co-writing with William F. Nolan the novel Logan's Run, the basis for the MGM 1976 film. He was also known for his television scripts for The Twilight Zone (including "Nothing in the Dark", "Kick the Can", "A Game of Pool", and "A Penny for Your Thoughts"), and the first telecast episode of Star Trek, entitled "The Man Trap". He also wrote the story and screenplay on which the 1960 and 2001 films Ocean's Eleven were based.

Early life
Johnson was born in a barn in Cheyenne, Wyoming, was forced to repeat the sixth grade, and dropped out of school entirely in the eighth. He briefly served as a telegraph operator and draftsman in the United States Army, then enrolled at the Alabama Polytechnic Institute (now Auburn University) under the G.I. Bill, but quit to return to his travels around the U.S., working as a draftsman, before becoming a writer.

Writing career

In 1959, Johnson wrote the story "I'll Take Care of You" for Alfred Hitchcock Presents. From 1959 onward, Johnson's work began to regularly appear in magazines such as Playboy, Los Angeles, The Twilight Zone Magazine, Rogue, and Gamma, and he began to write stories and scripts for TV. In 1960, he co-wrote the treatment (with Jack Golden Russell) for the Rat Pack film Ocean's 11, although most of the details were changed for the actual film. Later, Johnson joined the Southern California School of Writers that included, among others, William F. Nolan, Charles Beaumont, Richard Matheson and Ray Bradbury.

Through them he met Rod Serling, to whom he sold his story "All of Us Are Dying", which was produced as "The Four of Us Are Dying", scripted by Serling. Eventually, after selling other stories and having them scripted by other writers for the show, Johnson asked Serling to let him attempt a teleplay for the series, which was "A Penny for Your Thoughts". Later, after completing more scripts for The Twilight Zone, he worked as a writer for other television series, including Honey West, Wanted Dead or Alive, Route 66 and Kung Fu. Johnson also wrote the  Star Trek episode "The Man Trap", which was the first episode telecast. Johnson briefly had a L.A.-based radio program called "The Writer and the Story" which featured interviews with authors, including Charles Beaumont and William F. Nolan. As his career progressed, Johnson formed, in the 1960s, a loose, short-lived federation with fellow authors and friends Matheson, Theodore Sturgeon, and others called "The Green Hand". The intent was to leverage their works in the fashion of a union within the Hollywood system for TV production. Unfortunately, the enterprise fell apart after a few months. In his later years, he wrote comic books and was a frequent guest at science fiction and comics conventions. Johnson co-created the comic book series Deepest Dimension Terror Anthology with cartoonist and author Jay Allen Sanford.

Personal life
Johnson married Lola Brownstein on October 10, 1952, in Los Angeles, and fathered two children, Paul and Judy. He was a vocal advocate for the legalization of marijuana. Along with his writing output, Johnson was instrumental to the early development of San Diego Comic Con. He was also a longtime vegetarian.

Death
Johnson died on Christmas Day 2015, of bladder and prostate cancer at a Veterans Administration Medical Center hospital in North Hills, California. He is interred at Riverside National Cemetery.

Partial bibliography

Novels
 Ocean's 11 (1960) – Novelization (based on the story by George Clayton Johnson and Jack Golden Russell and screenplay by "George Johnson")
The Logan series
 Logan's Run (1967) – Novel (with William F. Nolan)
 Jessica's Run: A New Sequel for the Logan's Run Universe (George Clayton Johnson's long rumored personal sequel to Logan's Run said to be "in development"; yet to be published)

Television and film scripts
 Icarus Montgolfier Wright (with Ray Bradbury; 1962)
 Logan's Run (1976)

Alfred Hitchcock Presents
 "I'll Take Care of You" (1959; story by)

The Twilight Zone
 "The Four of Us Are Dying (1960; story by)
 "Execution" (1960; story by)
 "A Penny for Your Thoughts" (1961; teleplay)
 The Prime Mover (1961; story; uncredited) 
 "A Game of Pool" (1961; teleplay)
 "Nothing in the Dark" (1962; teleplay)
 "Kick the Can" (1962; teleplay; also featured in the 1983 movie The Twilight Zone: The Movie)
 "Ninety Years Without Slumbering" (1963; story by, as Johnson Smith)
 In 1960, Johnson submitted a story to The Twilight Zone called "Sea Change" which wasn't used but was later adapted for Johnson's 1994 comic book series Deepest Dimension Terror Anthology.

Route 66
 "Eleven, the Hard Way" (1961; written by)

Honey West
 "The Flame and the Pussycat" (1965; teleplay)

Star Trek
 "The Man Trap" (1966; teleplay; first aired episode of the series)

Kung Fu
 "The Demon God" (1974; teleplay)

Film, TV and documentary appearances
 Sea Hunt ("Sub Hatch" [Season 4, Episode 19]; 1961) as "USCG Lt. Hartwell"
 The Intruder (dir. Roger Corman; 1962) as villain "Phil West"
 Archive of American Television (2003) as himself
 Charles Beaumont: The Short Life of Twilight Zone's Magic Man (dir. Jason V Brock; JaSunni Productions, LLC; 2010) as himself
 The AckerMonster Chronicles! (dir. Jason V Brock; JaSunni Productions, LLC; 2012) as himself

Fiction collections
 Writing for The Twilight Zone (Outre House, 1980)
 George Clayton Johnson Twilight Zone Scripts & Stories (Streamline Pictures, 1996)
 All of Us Are Dying and Other Stories (Subterranean Press, 1999)

Awards and nominations

Notes

 Unused script by Johnson not selected for the original television series.
 Story was turned into a teleplay by Serling to the episode named The Four of Us Are Dying.

Further reading

References

External links

The Literary Estate of George Clayton Johnson

1929 births
2015 deaths
20th-century American military personnel
20th-century American novelists
20th-century American short story writers
American male novelists
American science fiction writers
American male screenwriters
Auburn University alumni
People from Cheyenne, Wyoming
United States Army soldiers
Writers from Wyoming
American male short story writers
Deaths from cancer in California
American male television writers
Burials at Riverside National Cemetery
20th-century American male writers
Inkpot Award winners
Telegraphists
American draughtsmen
American cannabis activists
Deaths from bladder cancer
Deaths from prostate cancer
Screenwriters from California
Screenwriters from Wyoming